The Hamble Rail Trail is a  circular footpath in Hampshire, southern England, comprising a path which runs alongside a disused railway track that connects Hamble-le-Rice to Royal Victoria Country Park and looping back via a section of the Solent Way footpath.

The railway track in question was constructed during the First World War to transport aircraft from Manchester to Hamble-le-Rice.  A siding was built as part of the railway to serve the flying boat factory in Hamble.  The line was not actually used during the war as hostilities ceased before it could be utilised; it was, however, purchased for the storage and transportation of oil to the BP oil terminal in Hamble.  BP maintain the option of reopening the line, but it has not been used since 1986 when it transported crude oil from Wytch Farm in Dorset, a route which has since been replaced by a  pipeline.

References

Footpaths in Hampshire
BP
Rail trails in England